The Methodist Episcopal Church of Goshen, located in Goshen, Oregon, is listed on the National Register of Historic Places.

See also
 National Register of Historic Places listings in Lane County, Oregon

References

Churches on the National Register of Historic Places in Oregon
Methodist churches in Oregon
National Register of Historic Places in Lane County, Oregon